Saisiyat may refer to:
Saisiyat people
Saisiyat language

Language and nationality disambiguation pages